Oeceoclades furcata is a terrestrial orchid species in the genus Oeceoclades that is endemic to northwestern Madagascar, where it grows in sandy soils. It was first described by the French botanists Jean Marie Bosser and Philippe Morat in 2001. The type specimen was collected in 1943 by the French botanist Raymond Decary from the Soalala District; this is the only known specimen of the species. The specific epithet furcata refers to the distinctive forked floral spur.

Description
The inflorescence is a simple raceme with about 15 widely spaced yellowish-white flowers with wine-colored spots.

References

furcata
Endemic flora of Madagascar
Plants described in 2001